Patrick Michael O'Hanlon (8 May 1944 – 7 April 2009), known as Paddy O'Hanlon, was an Irish barrister and former nationalist politician in Ireland.

Born in Drogheda Co.Louth, but resident in Mullaghbawn, South Armagh since childhood, O'Hanlon studied at University College Dublin. Prominent in the Northern Ireland Civil Rights Association, he was elected at the 1969 Northern Ireland general election, as an independent Nationalist MP for South Armagh. In August 1970, he was a founder member of the Social Democratic and Labour Party (SDLP).

The Parliament of Northern Ireland was abolished in 1973, and O'Hanlon was elected to the Northern Ireland Assembly, representing Armagh. In the Assembly, he was the SDLP's Chief Whip.

O'Hanlon stood for the Westminster constituency of Armagh at the February 1974 general election, taking second place, with 29.3% of the votes cast. He stood for the Northern Ireland Constitutional Convention and the 1982 Assembly in Armagh, but on both occasions was narrowly beaten by fellow party member Hugh News.

Following this second loss, O'Hanlon left active politics and qualified as a barrister; he remained a member of the SDLP.

O'Hanlon died on 7 April 2009 in Dublin's Mater Hospital following a short illness; he was 65 years old.

References

1944 births
2009 deaths
Alumni of University College Dublin
People from Drogheda
Politicians from County Louth
Members of the House of Commons of Northern Ireland 1969–1973
Members of the Northern Ireland Assembly 1973–1974
Independent members of the House of Commons of Northern Ireland
Social Democratic and Labour Party members of the House of Commons of Northern Ireland
Barristers from Northern Ireland
Members of the House of Commons of Northern Ireland for County Armagh constituencies